Linnea Sjöblom (born 12 November 1989) is a Swedish racing cyclist. She rode at the 2014 UCI Road World Championships.

References

External links

1989 births
Living people
Swedish female cyclists
Place of birth missing (living people)